Derek Benfield (11 March 1926 – 10 March 2009) was a British playwright and actor.

He was born in Bradford, West Riding of Yorkshire, and educated at Bingley Grammar School. He was the author of the stage farce Running Riot and played Patricia Routledge's character's husband in Hetty Wainthropp Investigates (1996–1998).

Arguably Benfield's best known character portrayal was as transport company foreman Bill Riley in the UK television series The Brothers in the early 1970s. Before this, he starred as Frank Skinner in the 1970 cult sci-fi series broadcast on UK ITV, Timeslip. Some of his other television roles included Walter Greenhalgh in Coronation Street (1961–1969), Albert the Clerk in Rumpole of the Bailey (1978–80), and characters in Breakaway (1980) and First of the Summer Wine (1988).

His film credits include small roles in Crossplot (1969), I Don't Want to Be Born (1975) and Lifeforce (1985). His plays included the farces Post Horn Gallop and Wild Goose Chase, both about the fictional exploits of the eccentric Lord and Lady Elrood and visitors to their castle.

He also appeared with Colin Baker as John Hallam in the Doctor Who audio play Catch-1782 produced by Big Finish Productions.

Plays
The Young in Heart, 1953 
The Way the Wind Blows, 1954 
Champagne for Breakfast, 1954 
Wild Goose Chase, 1955
Running Riot, 1958 
Out of Thin Air, 1961 
Fish out of Water, 1963
Down to Brass Tacks, 1964
Third Party Risk, 1964
The Party, 1964
Post Horn Gallop, 1965
Murder for the Asking, 1967
Off the Hook, 1970
A Bird in the hand, 1973 
Panic Stations, 1975
Caught on the Hop, 1979 
Beyond a Joke, 1980 
In for the Kill, 1981
Look Who's Talking, 1984 
Touch and Go, 1984 
Flying Feathers, 1987 
Bedside Manners, 1990 
Toe in the Water, 1991 
Don't Lose the Place, 1992 
Anyone for Breakfast?, 1994 
Up and Running, 1995 
A Fly in the Ointment, 1996 
Two and Two Together, 1999 
Second Time Around, 2000?  
Funny Business, 2005 
In At the Deep End, 2005 
Over My Dead Body, 2005?  
First Things First, 2007

Personal life
Benfield was married to actress Susan Lyle Grant from 1953. They had two children together. Benfield died in 2009 aged 82.

Filmography

Film

Television

References

External links
 
 Obituary in The Times
 Obituary in The Daily Telegraph
 Obituary in The Guardian
 Obituary in The Independent
 http://www.timeslip.org.uk/whoswho/derekbenfield.php 

1926 births
2009 deaths
English male television actors
Male actors from Bradford
People educated at Bingley Grammar School
English male dramatists and playwrights
20th-century English dramatists and playwrights
Alumni of RADA
20th-century English male writers
Writers from Bradford